Odontoglossum crocidipterum, the saffron-yellow two-winged odontoglossum, is a species of orchid found from Colombia to northwestern Venezuela. They are also reported to be found in Peru. They are generally found at elevations of 2200 meters to 2750 meters.

Subspecies
 Odontoglossum crocidipterum subsp. crocidipterum (Colombia)
 Odontoglossum crocidipterum subsp. dormanianum (Rchb.f.) Bockemühl 1989 (Venezuela)

crocidipterum